Bekyand may refer to:
 Anushavan, Armenia
 Mets Parni, Armenia